Koronas-Foton, also known as CORONAS-Photon (Complex Orbital Observations Near-Earth of Activity of the Sun-Photon), was a Russian Solar research satellite. It is the third satellite in the Russian Coronas programme, and part of the international Living With a Star programme. It was launched on 30 January 2009, from Site 32/2 at the Plesetsk Cosmodrome, aboard the final flight of the Tsyklon-3 rocket. On 1 December 2009 all scientific instruments on the satellite were turned off due to the problems with power supply that were caused by a design flaw. On 18 April 2010 the creators of the satellite announced it was lost "with a good deal of certainty".

Overview
The goal is to investigate the processes of free energy accumulation in the sun's atmosphere, accelerated particle phenomena and solar flares, and the correlation between solar activity and magnetic storms on Earth. Launch occurred successfully on 30 January 2009, and the first batch of science data was downloaded from the satellite on 19 February 2009. The satellite operates in a 500 x 500 km x 82.5° polar low Earth orbit and was expected to have an operational lifetime of three years.  It developed power system problems during the first eclipse season, about six months after launch, and contact with the satellite was lost on 1 December 2009.  The satellite returned to life on December 29, after its solar panels received enough light to power its control systems, but attempts to revive the satellite failed, and the satellite is considered lost.

On 5 July 2009, Koronas-Foton's TESIS telescope registered the most powerful solar outburst of the year so far, lasting 11 minutes, from 06:07 to 06:18 GMT. Solar X-ray pick intensity reached С2.7 in a 5-level scale used to classify solar flares. The last equally powerful outburst occurred on 25 March 2008.

Development
Koronas-Foton is a successor to the Koronas-F and Koronas-I satellites, launched in 1994 and 2001 respectively. It is being operated by the Russian Federal Space Agency, the Moscow Engineering Physics Institute and the All-Russian Scientific Research Institute of Electromechanics. It was built using a bus constructed for Meteor-M weather satellites,.

Koronas-Foton also carries three Indian Roentgen Telescope or RT instruments: RT-2/S, RT-2/G, and RT-2/CZT. These will be used to conduct photometric and spectrometric research into the Sun, and for low-energy gamma-ray imagery. These instruments will be operated by the Indian Space Research Organisation (ISRO), and were constructed by a collaboration of the Vikram Sarabhai Space Centre, Tata Institute of Fundamental Research and Indian Centre for Space Physics.

Instruments
The satellite's scientific payload includes an array of 12 instruments. Eight instruments were designed for registering electromagnetic radiation from the Sun in a wide range of spectrum from near electromagnetic waves to gamma-radiation, as well as solar neutrons. Two instruments were designed to detect charged particles such as protons and electrons.

Scientific instruments:
Natalya-2M spectrometer MIFI, Moscow, Russia
RT-2 gamma-telescope  TIFR/ICSP/VSSC, India.
Pingvin-M (Penguin) polarimeter MIFI, Moscow, Russia
Konus-RF x-ray and gamma spectrometer Ioffe Institute, Russia
BRM x-ray detector MIFI, Russia
FOKA UV-detector MIFI, Russia
TESIS telescope/spectrometer FIAN, Russia, with SphinX soft X-ray spectrophotometer, SRC PAS, Poland
Electron-M-Peska charged particles analyser NIIYaF MGU, Russia
STEP-F Electron and proton detector Kharkov National University, Ukraine
SM-8M magnetometer NPP Geologorazvedka/MIFI, Russia

Service systems:
SSRNI science data collection and registration system IKI, Russia
Radio transmission system and antennas RNII KP, Russia

See also

2009 in spaceflight
Koronas-I
Koronas-F

References

Missions to the Sun
Spacecraft launched in 2009
Satellites of Russia
2009 in Russia